PAZ-3205 is a common Soviet midibus model made by the Pavlovo Bus Factory. It is common in Russia and other Eastern European countries as both a low-intensity route public bus and as a hearse. Model 3205 was launched on December 1, 1989, replacing a similarly specified PAZ-672 (a 1968 model).

PAZ buses are mainly used for urban Marshrutki, rural and regional services. Current PAZ buses are equipped with 120-140 horsepower Russian (ZMZ) or Belorussian (MMZ) diesel or petrol Euro III emission compliant engines, and have maximum speed of 90 km/h. PAZ is also offering installation of Hino Motors, Cummins, Andoria and BAMO imported engines for rear wheel drive models.

In 2013 a facelifted model entered production.

Major current modifications include:

Variants
PAZ buses are commonly employed by firefighters and police - for ordinary busing and as "mobile headquarters". PAZ funeral buses have rear door, floor rails and safety straps for carrying a coffin in the rear. Passenger seats are arranged in long benches along the sides, facing the coffin.

Production
Production of PAZ-3205 (with all derivatives) in the 2000s (decade) was steadily rising, accounting for at least 80% of PAZ output:

References

GAZ Group buses
Buses of the Soviet Union
Vehicles introduced in 1989